Blagnac Football Club is a French association football club founded in 1963. They are based in Blagnac, Toulouse and are currently playing in the sixth tier in the French football league system. They play at the Stade Municipal des Ramiers.

History
Blagnac Football Club was founded relatively late in 1962 after a Frenchman by the name of Louis Héraud discovered that the town of Blagnac had no football club. Héraud, along with his supporters, proceeded to go door-to-door collecting up to 20 euros from local Blagnac townspeople in order to begin the process of creating the club. However, it wasn't until a man commonly called Mr. Béranger, a manager of a restaurant in the local airport agreed to fund the club. The club was officially formed on 4 March 1962 as Football Club Blagnacais. Béranger was given the role of president, while Héraud was given dual-roles as vice president and secretary general. The club's first manager was André Augé. In the club's early years of existence, they primarily played with players from the local and regional level of French football, as well as players well past their prime that came from Toulouse FC.

Honours
Vice-champion de France Division 4: 1990
Champion DH Midi-Pyrénées: 1988
Coupe de Midi-Pyrénées: 1981

Current squad

Statistics and records

Statistics 

 Associates: 4,000
 Most goals scored in one match home: Blagnac 7 – Athletic Club Avignonnais 0 (2009–10).

Records 
 In the 2000–2001 and 2001–2002 seasons, finished with an accumulative league unbeaten run after 62 games.
 Jean-Germain de la Roche holds the record for goals in the history of Blagnac (304 goals).
 Jean-Germain de la Roche is the top scorer in the history of Blagnac's Cup Runs (41 goals).

References

External links
 Official Site

Association football clubs established in 1962
Sport in Haute-Garonne
Football clubs in Occitania (administrative region)
1962 establishments in France